Baz may refer to:

Places
Baz, Albania, a village
Baz, Iran, a village in central Iran
Baz (tribe), an Assyrian tribe from eastern Turkey
BAZ, IATA airport code of Barcelos Airport, Barcelos, Brazil
BAZ, FAA airport code of New Braunfels Municipal Airport, New Braunfels, Texas, United States
Bazm, Fars, also known as Bāz, a village in Iran
Borsod-Abaúj-Zemplén, or BAZ, a county in Hungary

Brands and enterprises
Baz (software), distributed version control software
Basler Zeitung (BaZ), a regional newspaper, published in Basel, Switzerland
Bratislavské Automobilové Závody, or BAZ, a Slovak car manufacturer of Czech Skoda and VW Group cars from 1971(?) to 1982
Bryanskyi Avtomobilnyi Zavod, or BAZ, a Russian heavy truck manufacturer

Other uses
Baz (name), a list of people and fictional characters with the surname, given name or nickname
Baz Pitch, vampire and gay for Simon Snow, from Carry on, by Rainbow Rowell, "Because I'm disturbed. Ask anyone"
Baz, a common name for foobar, also 
Bundesanstalt für Züchtungsforschung, or BAZ, a research organisation in Germany